Tang Enbo (birth name was , |)(1898–1954) was a Nationalist general in the Republic of China.

Life

Early life and war with Japan

Born in 1898 in Wuyi, Zhejiang, Tang Enbo was a graduate of the Imperial Japanese Army Academy, and therefore was familiar with the tactics of his Japanese enemy during the Second Sino-Japanese War. Tang's early resistance to the Japanese invasion was most ineffective, due to the political situation in China— Tang's superior Chiang Kai-shek was reluctant to devote his best troops to fight the Japanese invaders, wishing instead to use them to exterminate the Communists. Limited in troops and material, any commander would have had great difficulties in fighting such a superior enemy, and Tang Enbo was no exception.

Furthermore, the battle plans though successful on paper rarely materialized on the battlefield during this stage because local Chinese warlords were only interested in maintaining their forces and largely ignored Chiang Kai-shek's orders. Although Tang did contribute to the victory at Battle of Taierzhuang, he was unable to stop the Japanese assaults during the 1944 Battle of Henan-Hunan-Guangxi, losing 37 cities and towns within 36 days.

Chinese Civil War
After World War II, Tang Enbo participated in the struggle against the communists, who attempted to win Tang Enbo. Tang was hesitant at the first due to his military failure in the Chinese Civil War, but soon his fourth concubine convinced him to firmly follow Chiang Kai-shek and stay with Kuomintang. As a result, Tang Enbo informed Chiang Kai-shek that his teacher and superior Chen Yi had asked him to turn to the communists and Chen was then arrested. Chen Yi was later executed at Machangding, Taipei, on June 18, 1950, and was buried in Wugu, Taipei County.

The fallout of all this was that Tang Enbo had now lost the trust of Chiang Kai-shek. Tang's position was further weakened when other Nationalist cadres such as Gu Zhenggang (谷正纲) discovered and revealed to Chiang Kai-shek that during the Shanghai Campaign Tang was preparing to flee to Japan by asking his close associates Wang Wencheng (王文成) and Long Zuoliang (龙佐良) to seek out a home in Japan.

Death
On May 6, 1949, a close friend of Tang's wired half a million US dollars to an American friend's account, and subsequently, the money was sent via this account to Wang Wencheng and Long Zuoliang in Japan. In July, 1949, Wang Wencheng and Long Zuoliang purchased a mansion with 22 rooms in a Tokyo suburb. However, all of this was accidentally made public on February 2, 1950, when Reuters issued the news in Tokyo claiming that Chiang Kai-shek had purchased a mansion in a Tokyo suburb via a top ranking Chinese official. It was rumored that Tang's political enemies within the Kuomintang had long been tracking Tang's every move and waited for the right opportunity to bring him down, but such a claim has yet to be confirmed. The result was Tang's complete falling out of favor with Chiang, who reportedly angrily shouted: "No wonder our defeat was so rapid in Shanghai and the southeastern coast— he (Tang Enbo) was already prepared to flee!"

After fleeing to Taiwan with the retreating Republic of China government, Tang Enbo became ill and was sent to Japan for treatment. However, Tang died after surgery in Tokyo in 1954.

Military career 

 1932 General Officer Commanding 89th Division, Henan
 1937 Commander in Chief Taiyuan Pacification Headquarters' Frontline Forces
 1937 - 1938 General Officer Commanding XIII Corps
 1937 - 1938 General Officer Commanding 20th Army
 1938 - 1940 Commander in Chief 31st Army Group
 1944 Deputy Commander in Chief 1st War Area
 1944 Deputy Commander in Chief 4th War Area
 1944 - 1945 Commander in Chief 3rd Front Army
 1949        Commander in Chief defense of Shanghai

References
 http://www.generals.dk/general/Tang_Enbo/_/China.html
Ministry of National Defense R.O.C 
Zhu, Zongzhen and Wang, Chaoguang, Liberation War History, 1st Edition, Social Scientific Literary Publishing House in Beijing, 2000,  (set)
Zhang, Ping, History of the Liberation War, 1st Edition, Chinese Youth Publishing House in Beijing, 1987,  (pbk.)
Jie, Lifu, Records of the Liberation War: The Decisive Battle of Two Kinds of Fates, 1st Edition, Hebei People's Publishing House in Shijiazhuang, 1990,  (set)
Literary and Historical Research Committee of the Anhui Committee of the Chinese People's Political Consultative Conference, Liberation War, 1st Edition, Anhui People's Publishing House in Hefei, 1987, 
Li, Zuomin, Heroic Division and Iron Horse: Records of the Liberation War, 1st Edition, Chinese Communist Party History Publishing House in Beijing, 2004, 
Wang, Xingsheng, and Zhang, Jingshan, Chinese Liberation War, 1st Edition, People's Liberation Army Literature and Art Publishing House in Beijing, 2001,  (set)
Huang, Youlan, History of the Chinese People's Liberation War, 1st Edition, Archives Publishing House in Beijing, 1992, 
Liu Wusheng, From Yan'an to Beijing: A Collection of Military Records and Research Publications of Important Campaigns in the Liberation War, 1st Edition, Central Literary Publishing House in Beijing, 1993, 
Tang, Yilu and Bi, Jianzhong, History of Chinese People's Liberation Army in Chinese Liberation War, 1st Edition, Military Scientific Publishing House in Beijing, 1993 – 1997,  (Volume 1), 7800219615 (Volume 2), 7800219631 (Volume 3), 7801370937 (Volume 4), and 7801370953 (Volume 5)

1898 births
1954 deaths
Chinese people of World War II
National Revolutionary Army generals from Zhejiang
People from Jinhua
Recipients of the Order of Blue Sky and White Sun
Chinese Civil War refugees
Taiwanese people from Zhejiang
Chinese anti-communists